The Panther City Lacrosse Club is a professional lacrosse team based in Fort Worth, Texas. The team plays in the National Lacrosse League (NLL). The 2022 season is the Inaugural season in franchise history.

Regular season

Final standings

Game log

Entry Draft
The 2021 NLL Entry Draft took place on August 28, 2021. The Panther City made the following selections:

References

Fort Worth
Panther City Lacrosse Club
Panther City LC seasons